This is a list of countries by eggplant (aubergine) production from the years 2016 to 2020, based on data from the Food and Agriculture Organization Corporate Statistical Database. The estimated total world production for eggplants in 2020 was 56,618,843 metric tonnes, up by 2.2% from 55,376,521 tonnes in 2019. China was by far the largest producer of eggplants, accounting for nearly 65% of global production at 36,557,611 tonnes. Dependent territories are shown in italics.

Production by country

Notes

References 

Eggplant
Eggplants
Eggplant production